Fuzzy Warbles Volume 5 is the fifth volume in the Fuzzy Warbles series, released in September 2004. The Fuzzy Warbles Series brings together demos, rarities and side projects from XTC founding member Andy Partridge.

Track listing
All songs written by Andy Partridge.
 "Welcome to Volume 5" – 0:25
 "Young Cleopatra" – 3:51
 "I Defy You Gravity" – 4:18
 "Ice Jet Kiss" – 0:36
 "Broomstick Rhythm" – 3:37
 "Earn Enough for Us" – 3:03
 "Dear God (Skiffle Version)" – 1:00
 "Crocodile" – 3:49
 "Motorcycle Landscape" – 4:38
 "Rook" – 3:44
 "Don't You Ever Dare Call Me Chickenhead" – 2:12
 "Mermaid Explanation" – 1:05
 "Mermaid Smiled" – 2:26
 "Aqua Deum" – 2:36
 "Me and the Wind" – 4:19
 "Smalltown" – 4:01
 "Blue Overall" – 3:09
 "Red Brick Dream" – 1:22
 "Jacob's Ladder" – 6:14
 "My Land Is Burning" – 6:55

Personnel
Andy Partridge – instruments and vocals on all tracks

Credits
All songs were recorded at Andy's home except 14 at Ollie Studios, London and 19 at Tudor Studios, Swindon.
Mastered by Ian Cooper at Metropolis Mastering, London
Sleeve art by Andrew Swainson
Thank you thank you Jiri Trnka, Jan Svankmajer, Karel Zamen, Gerry Anderson, George Pal, Roberta Leigh and all other puppet magic meisters.
Erica for naked yoga.
Big thanks to Virgin Records for making this series possible.

Andy Partridge albums
Demo albums
2004 compilation albums